The Act respecting the laicity of the State, introduced and commonly referred to as Bill 21 or Law 21, is a statute passed by the National Assembly of Quebec in 2019 which asserts that Quebec is lay state (secular state). It prohibits the wearing of religious symbols by certain public employees in positions of authority and grandfathers in those who were already in office when the bill was introduced. The statute operates despite the Quebec Charter of Human Rights and Freedoms, and also notwithstanding certain sections of the Canadian Charter of Rights and Freedoms.

On April 20, 2021, the Superior Court of Quebec upheld most of the law, despite stating that the law violates the freedom of expression and religion of religious minorities (especially Muslim women), because the government invoked the notwithstanding clause. However, the court did rule that the law was inoperative with respect to English-language school boards and members of the National Assembly as it infringed on their constitutional rights arguing that minority language rights cannot be overriden by the notwithstanding clause. The Government of Quebec appealed the judgment to the Quebec Court of Appeal. The Autonomous Federation of Education also decided to bring the case to the higher court. English-language school boards must apply the statute until the appeal is decided; an interlocutory application to temporarily exempt the school boards was rejected by the Quebec Court of Appeal in November 2021.

While the statute is supported by most of Quebec's population, some argue that it does not go far enough and should extend to daycares, while others argue that the statute is discriminatory against religious groups like Muslims, Jews, and Sikhs. Disapproval of the statute is more widespread in English Canada than in French Canada.

Contents and passage 
The Coalition Avenir Québec (CAQ) government tabled Bill 21 on March 28, 2019, which they campaigned on during the 2018 provincial election. Now enacted, the Act bans public workers in positions of "authority" from wearing religious symbols, specifically while they are on duty. According to the text of the bill, the laicity of the state is defined by a neutral religious stance, keeping state and religious affairs apart, as well as promoting equality and freedom of conscience and religion among citizens.

The first section of An Act Respecting laicity of the State asserts that Quebec is a "lay State". The laicity of the state is based on four principles:
 the equality of all citizens
the separation of State and religions
the religious neutrality of the State
freedom of conscience and freedom of religion

According to the second paragraph of section 4, "State laicity also requires that all persons have the right to lay parliamentary, government and judicial institutions, and to lay public services".

Immigration Minister Simon Jolin-Barrette said all religious symbols, regardless of the size of the object, would be prohibited, but not religious tattoos or hairstyles such as Rastafarian dreadlocks. The law affects:

 Any public employee who carries a weapon, including police officers, courthouse constables, bodyguards, prison guards, and wildlife officers
 Crown prosecutors, government lawyers, and judges
 School principals, vice-principals and teachers

A grandfather clause exempts some public workers as long as they continue to hold the same job, at the same institution. The law also details rules that require people to uncover their faces to receive a public service for identification or security purposes, such as taking public transit with a reduced-fare photo ID card. However, people who have their faces covered for medical reasons or to do their jobs are exempt from these rules.

The law applies when receiving government services, including:

 Municipal services such as public transit
 Doctors, dentists, and midwives in public institutions
 Subsidized daycares
 School boards

The Act also invokes section 33 of the Canadian Charter of Rights and Freedoms, the notwithstanding clause, and states that the Act shall have effect notwithstanding section 2 of the Canadian Charter (which protects freedom of religion and freedom of expression), and sections 7 to 15 of the Canadian Charter (section 15 of the Canadian Charter prohibits discrimination by governments, including on the basis of religion).  The Act also states that it will apply despite sections 1 to 38 of the Quebec Charter of human rights and freedoms. These provisions were included to avoid legal challenges based on the Canadian Charter of Rights and Freedoms and the Quebec Charter of Human Rights and Freedoms, which was amended to assert that "state laicity" is of "fundamental importance".

It passed on June 16 by a 73–35 vote, with backing of the CAQ and the Parti Québécois. The Quebec Liberal Party and Québec solidaire were opposed. The CAQ government also introduced last-minute amendments toughening the law, making provisions for a minister to verify that it is being obeyed and to demand corrective measures if necessary.

Prior legislation

Proposed Charter of Values 
The Parti Québécois in 2013 under Premier Pauline Marois proposed the Quebec Charter of Values, a law banning the display of "ostentatious" religious symbols, but they were unable to pass it before losing an election some months thereafter.

Bill 62
An act to foster adherence to State religious neutrality and, in particular, to provide a framework for requests for accommodations on religious grounds in certain bodies, introduced as Bill 62 and passed by Premier Philippe Couillard's Liberal government in October 2017 made world headlines. The law banned a person whose face is covered from delivering or receiving a public service. Justice Minister Stéphanie Vallée stated that people could seek religious exemption on a "case by case" basis.

Criticism 
The ban has worried some conservative Muslims who consider face covering a necessary part of their religion and have defined the move as Islamophobia. Prime Minister Justin Trudeau spoke out against it. Several scholars have also criticised the ban. The ban was challenged by the Canadian Civil Liberties Association and the National Council of Canadian Muslims in the Quebec Superior Court. Meanwhile, the Parti Québécois (PQ) and the Coalition Avenir Québec (CAQ) argued the ban was not extensive enough. Some journalists accused Couillard of supporting the ban for “perceived political advantage,” while a majority of the general public expressed their support for this move.

Public opinion 
With regard to public opinion, an October 27 Ipsos poll found that 76 per cent of Quebecers backed Bill 62, with 24 per cent opposing it. The same survey found the 68 per cent of Canadians in general supported a law similar to Bill 62 in their part of Canada. An October 27 Angus Reid Institute poll found that 70 per cent Canadians outside of Quebec supported "legislation similar to Bill 62" where they lived in the country, with 30 per cent opposing it.

Court challenges 
Several legal challenges were filed against the law and a judge ruled that the face-covering ban cannot be applicable while analysis by another court, because of irreversible injury it may cause some women of the Muslim faith. Another judge granted an injunction on that section questioned in court by the National Council of Canadian Muslims with the participation of the Canadian Civil Liberties Association. In the judgment of the court, said section contravenes the freedoms guaranteed by the Quebec Charter of Human Rights and Freedoms, and the Canadian Charter of Rights and Freedoms.

The Quebec Liberal Party government confirmed that it would not appeal that suspension of the key article of its Religious Neutrality Act. The Government of Quebec preferred to wait for a judgement on the substance and constitutionality of the law.

If the Liberal government had been re-elected in the general election on October 1, 2018, Premier Philippe Couillard said he would be ready to go to the Supreme Court of Canada, if necessary, to defend Bill 62. From his previous comments on the matter, Couillard was not likely to preserve the face covering ban by invoking section 33 of the Canadian Charter of Rights and Freedoms, the notwithstanding clause. Couillard stated that his government, in passing Bill 62, did not use the notwithstanding clause by design, asserting that the court would uphold his government’s limited ban as reasonable and justified.

Reception

Opposition 
The Quebec Liberal Party said the law would go too far, particularly in respect to Muslim women, and continued to advocate a ban only on religious clothing which covered the face, such as the niqab. Québec solidaire said that it was opposed to any ban on the wearing of religious symbols. Quebec Liberal leadership candidate, Dominique Anglade, argued that “We are all in favour of secularism, but not the way it was done with Bill 21.” The Parti Québécois said the ban did not go far enough, and that it should have been extended to public daycare workers, as in its proposed legislation.

Gérard Bouchard and Charles Taylor, authors of the Bouchard-Taylor report on reasonable accommodations, raised concern that the law makes the province not look like a “decent society” and will only feed an intolerance toward minorities.

Various forms of resistance to Law 21 have emerged since its inception. Some are the legal challenges described below. The Coalition Inclusion Quebec is taking legal action on the basis that Law 21 specifically targets Muslim women. The Coalition Inclusion Quebec is challenging the use of the notwithstanding clause because it cannot be used against Section 28 of the Charter, regarding gender discrimination. Another court case is being filed by the English Montreal School Board on the basis of violating minority language rights. Calgary City Council and Edmonton City Council voted unanimously to condemn Bill 21 with mayors Naheed Nenshi of Calgary and Don Iveson of Edmonton urging other municipal governments to speak out against Law 21.

New Democratic Party leader Jagmeet Singh said that he would support federal intervention in court to challenge Law 21.

Federal antisemitism envoy Irwin Cotler has called Law 21 "discriminatory", adding that "It does not so much separate religion and state as it authorizes state interference with religion".

Support 
Prior to the Quiet Revolution in the 1960s, Quebec was heavily influenced by the Catholic Church, including the education system. The arrangement was unpopular, with many older Quebeckers later reporting negative experiences while in school. People saw the role of the church as a "necessary step on the road to modernity, to building a secular, more egalitarian society, freed from the evils of superstition". Religion came to be seen as a social construct that society and people can choose to adopt or to disregard.

David Rand wrote in a CBC News column that the law is a positive step forward in ensuring the religious neutrality of the state. He explained that in the culture of Quebec, religion is a private matter and that members of the civil service must be neutral while at work. Similar to existing legislation which prohibits employees from wearing partisan political symbols on the job. Law 21 extends the principle to religious symbols. It does not ban religious believers from government jobs but instead excludes only their religious symbols if they are in positions of authority, and only while on the job. The bill intends to eliminate any perceived religious favouritism and protect freedom of conscience for users of government services by ensuring they are not subjected to unnecessary displays of religion.

A 2019 poll conducted by Forum Research reported the law enjoyed 64 per cent support in Quebec.

The Parti Québécois Supports it but, said the ban did not go far enough, and that it should have been extended to public daycare workers, as in its proposed legislation.

Mouvement laïque québécois MLQ supports the Bill, but they say it doesn't go far enough.

Federal election 
Law 21 was debated in the 2019 federal election. Bloc Quebecois leader Yves-Francois Blanchet stated this was a provincial matter and not relevant to the federal government's jurisdiction but did campaign in favour of Law 21. When explaining why being called a nationalist to Canada Press is not seen a pejorative, Joseph Yvon Thériault, a sociology professor at University of Quebec at Montreal, compared Bill 21 to stricter legislation in European countries such as France and Belgium as an argument that Quebec nationalism is based on moderation.

Court challenges
The law has faced many legal challenges. 

The National Council of Canadian Muslims (NCCM) and the Canadian Civil Liberties Association (CCLA) filed a legal challenge against the law which aimed to stay its application. The groups argue that the law is unconstitutional, irreparably harms religious minorities and constitutes "state-sanctioned second class citizenship." The Quebec Court of Appeal later granted the petitioning organizations leave to appeal the claim for an injunction. The Coalition Inclusion Quebec announced a challenge to the ruling at the Quebec Court of Appeal in order to strike down the entire law. A 29-day hearing into challenges to the law was heard in the Quebec Superior Court in 2020.

In April 2021, Quebec Superior Court judge Marc-André Blanchard ruled that the law violated the freedom of expression and religion of religious minorities (especially Muslim women). Blanchard stated the law "in one way violat[es] their freedom of religion, and in another, [does] the same in regards to their freedom of expression, since clothing constitutes both pure and simple expression, and also the manifestation of a religious belief." Nevertheless he upheld most of the ban as the government had invoked the notwithstanding clause. However, he ruled that the provisions were unconstitutional, to the extent they applied to English-language school boards, as the notwithstanding clause cannot be used to restrict minority language rights protected by the Canadian Charter Rights and Freedoms.  Similarly, the notwithstanding clause cannot be used to restrict rights granted by s. 3 of the Canadian Charter to elected members of the legislative assemblies, so the law was unconstitutional to the extent it purported to apply to members of the National Assembly.

See also
 Laïcité
 French ban on face covering
 Hijab by country#Canada
 Islam in Canada

References

External links
 
 
 

2019 in Quebec
Clothing in politics
Clothing controversies
Political controversies in Canada
Politics of Quebec
Quebec provincial legislation
Religious controversies in Canada
Political history of Quebec